Calgary International Airport , branded as YYC Calgary International Airport, is an international airport that serves the city of Calgary, Alberta, Canada. With 14.5 million passengers in 2022 and 124,108 aircraft movements in 2021, Calgary International is the busiest airport in Alberta and the fourth-busiest in Canada by passenger traffic. This airport is served by the Calgary International Airport Emergency Response Service for aircraft rescue and firefighting (ARFF) protection. The region's petroleum and tourism industries (and its proximity to Banff National Park) have helped foster growth at the airport, which has nonstop flights to an array of destinations in North and Central America, Europe, and Asia. Calgary serves as the headquarters and primary hub for WestJet.

Built in the late 1930s, the site has since grown to house four runways, two terminal buildings with five concourses for passengers, warehouses for cargo handling, and other infrastructure. The Calgary Airport Authority operates the property while paying rent to the federal government. Close to the airport is the Deerfoot Trail freeway for transport into the city, and public transit also serves the airport.

History

Early history
The first airport to serve Calgary opened in 1914, in the neighbourhood of Bowness. It occupied one-square kilometre and consisted of a hut and a grass runway. The site of the first airport is the location of a community centre (The Landing) as well as Bowness High School and Bowglen Park.

Operations shifted to a new airport southwest of the city in 1928, named Old Banff Coach Road Airport. However, issues with turbulence in the area prompted another airfield to be built the following year in the neighbourhood of Renfrew known as the Calgary Municipal Airport or Stanley Jones Airport. The local airline Renfew Air Service constructed the Rutledge Hangar at the Renfrew site (6th Street and Regal Crescent) in 1929, a lamella arch structure composed of Douglas Fir planks on a reinforced concrete base. The Renfew Air Service folded in November 1931 as a result of the Great Depression, and ownership of the Rutledge Hangar was taken over by the Edmonton Credit Corporation who subsequently lease the hangar to the City of Calgary. The RCAF used the airport in the 1940s. The Rutledge Hangar remains standing at the original Renfew site by Boys and Girls Club of Calgary and was designated an Alberta Provincial Historic Resource on 5 May 2003.

Present site and Second World War
As the City of Calgary grew to surround the Renfrew airport site the municipal government decided to relocate the airport to a new location. The city purchased an area of land north of Calgary in 1938 for about $31,000; and remains the site of Calgary's current airport. The city came to an agreement with Trans-Canada Air Lines to construct and lease a hangar on the site for $45,000, and the federal Department of Transportation financed the construction of three runways and other improvements, the first of which opened on 25 September. The new Calgary airfield was named McCall Field after First World War ace and lifelong Calgarian Fred McCall.

As a result of Canada entering the Second World War, the federal government assumed control of McCall Field in 1940, re-purposing it as a fuel and maintenance stop for aircraft involved in the war effort and later stationing the No. 37 Service Flying Training School at the airfield from 22 October 1941 until its closure on 10 March 1944. McCall Field continued to operate regular passenger flights during the Second World War.

Following the end of the Second World War, the airport had been expanded to include additional hangars, four runways and other infrastructure. At the time of completion, McCall Field's east–west runway was the third-longest runway in Alberta behind the Calgary Airport's north–south runway and the runway at CFB Namao.

1950s and 1960s, terminal expansion and jet age
The re-purposed military hangars did not meet the needs of the growing transportation needs of the city, and efforts were made by city officials to secure funding for a new passenger terminal. A new passenger terminal was constructed in 1956; its design originated in the 1950s as a thesis project by Provincial Institute of Technology and Art architecture student Ken Bond, who later formed the architectural firm Clayton, Bond and Mogridge, which was awarded the contract for designing the new terminal. The one-million dollar project featured an open public concourse, and ticketing offices for three airlines was dubbed one of the most modern air terminals in Canada when it opened on 2 June 1956. A lavish opening ceremony was attended by federal Transportation Minister George C. Marler, Lieutenant Governor of Alberta John J. Bowlen, and Mayor Donald Hugh Mackay, and a number of other dignitaries. The festivities included an air show featuring an Avro Canada CF-100 Canuck.

In the 1960s Calgary City Council began lobbing the federal government to designate McCall Field as an "international airport", a status defined by the Department of Transportation. As a compromise on April 6, 1962, the federal government approved the naming the airport terminal Calgary International Airport from Calgary Municipal Airport. However, Mayor Harry Hays, local Aldermen and residents continued to refer to the airport in general as McCall Field. Calgary International Airport did not receive official "International" status from the federal government until 1969. The first non-stop transatlantic flights were scheduled by Canadian Pacific Airlines in 1961, connecting Calgary with Amsterdam Airport Schiphol, and more flights from Europe commenced the following year.

The jet age arrived shortly after the construction of Calgary's new passenger terminal. The terminal was not designed with jet aircraft in mind, and the airport's runways were not suitable for the larger and faster aircraft. In 1961 the airport replaced the diagonal runway with an  runway capable of handling modern jet aircraft.

The City of Calgary was unable to afford the continued upgrades the Calgary Municipal Airport necessary to cope with the rising aircraft traffic. The city proceeded to sell the Calgary Municipal Airport to the federal government in 1966 for $2 million, and the Department of Transportation proceeded to refurbish the runways shortly afterwards.

1970s, terminal and hub status
The new passenger terminal constructed in 1956 proved to only temporarily meet the needs of the city, and was inadequate for expansion or facilitating jet aircraft servicing. Following the sale of the Calgary International Airport by the City of Calgary to the Government of Canada in 1966, plans were put in motion to build a new passenger terminal. The airport's sale came with a promise by Federal Transportation Minister Jack Pickersgill that the federal government would build a $20-million passenger terminal within five years; however, continued delays pushed completion of the terminal to 1977.

Construction began on the new passenger terminal in 1972, construction would be delayed due to re-designs to meet increased air traffic needs, causing the price of the new terminal to grow well beyond the original $20-million figure. Finally, on 12 October 1977, the new $130-million (equivalent to $-million in ),  terminal was opened by Mayor Rod Sykes, Provincial Transportation Minister Hugh Horner, and Federal Transportation Minister Otto Lang two months before construction had completed. Sykes was able to leverage his friendship with Lord Mountbatten to convince British Airways to have one of the newly introduced Concorde land in Calgary on the day, and although the jet showed up a day late due to mechanical issues, it was still quite the coup for a city of less than half a million residents. Among other festivities for the opening event included flyovers by a Boeing 747, Lockheed F-104 Starfighter, and the Canadian Air Force Snowbirds. The 1977 passenger terminal remains the core of Calgary International Airport's domestic terminal to this day.

The Jumbo Jet age arrived in Calgary with the newly introduced Boeing 747 landing for the first time in 1973, with Wardair providing non-stop bi-weekly charter service from Calgary to London. Air Canada was not far behind, and began non-stop service to London using the 747 starting on June 27, 1974. In April 1974, Calgary International Airport hosted CP Air's flight testing for the Boeing 747 after airport firefighters went on strike at both Vancouver International Airport and Toronto Pearson Airport.

In 1974 the Government of Alberta acquired ownership of Pacific Western Airlines, Canada's third largest airline at the time and move the head office and hub to Calgary. The airline continued under provincial government ownership until 1983, and later merged with Canadian Pacific Air Lines to form Canadian Airlines. Canadian Airlines maintained Calgary as the hub and headquarters for the airline until it was acquired by Air Canada in 2001.

1990s reorganization and WestJet
In the early 1990s the Government of Canada introduced the National Airports Policy which moved towards privatization, liberalization and economic deregulation of air transportation, which included the formation of a Local Airport Authority under the name Calgary Airport Authority in 1992 for the management, operation and development of the Calgary International Airport under lease from the federal government. The Calgary Airport Authority, incorporated in July 1990 is a non-share capital, not-for-profit corporation formed under the authority of Alberta's Regional Airports Authorities Act. The Calgary Airport Authority signed a long-term 60-year lease with an additional 20-year option, which was subsequently exercised in 2011.

In 1992, Calgary International Airport opened a new air traffic control tower at the southern end of Aero Drive.

In February 1996 WestJet, which began as a low-cost carrier began operations with a base of operations at Calgary International, occupying an expanded area of the terminal. The airline's first flight, a Boeing 737 departed Calgary International on route to Vancouver International Airport on 29 February 1996.

Operation Yellow Ribbon
During the September 11, 2001 attacks 13 international flights destined for the United States were diverted to Calgary International Airport as part of Operation Yellow Ribbon. The operation was a joint effort between NAV Canada and Transport Canada in communication with the U.S. Federal Aviation Administration, which facilitated the grounding of potentially destructive air traffic.

2000s, runway and new terminal
The Calgary Airport Authority began analyzing the facility's air capacity in the late 1990s, and found the airport could reach its maximum capacity as early as 2006. The Airport Authority and NAV Canada made a number of changes to airport operations in the 2000s to improve the efficiency and capacity of the facility, but by 2008, with a number of changes made, NAV Canada reported the airfield would begin to exceed its practical capacity. The Calgary Airport Authority planned and under the "Airport Development Program", a major development program aimed at improving the capacity and quality of the airport, which included the construction of a new runway, air traffic control tower and passenger terminal.

On 25 May 2013, the new Air Traffic Control Tower opened at Calgary International Airport. The one-year, $25-million (equivalent to $-million) project came in advance of the airport's new runway, and at 91 m (300 ft), the tower was the tallest free-standing control tower in Canada. The airport's previous 50 m (165 ft) control tower was demolished in October 2014.

The Calgary Airport Authority initiated the Parallel Runway Project, a $620-million (equivalent to $-million) project to assess and construct a new runway, which led to the construction of the  runway 17L/35R beginning in April 2011. Upon its completion on June 28, 2014, runway 17L/35R became the longest runway in Canada. During the construction of the runway, a $295-million (equivalent to $-million), six-lane roadway tunnel was constructed underneath the runway to connect Barlow Trail to 36th Street N.E. The decision for Calgary City Council on whether to construct the tunnel while the runway was being constructed, or wait until a later date was a major issue during the 2010 Calgary municipal election.

The Airport Authority addressed cargo capacity through the construction of a  cargo facility in 2015 followed by a  facility constructed in 2016.

The final stage of the Calgary Airport Authority's Airport Development Program was the construction of a new $1.6-billion (equivalent to $-billion) international terminal. Officially opened on 31 October 2016, the international terminal  facility added 24 new aircraft gates, North America's first call-to-gate passenger boarding system, CATSA Plus enhanced passenger screening system, moving walkways and dedicated electric passenger vehicle system.

In October 2016 Transport Canada officially renamed Calgary International Airport to "YYC Calgary International Airport", affixing the "YYC" IATA code to the airport's name.

In 2020, after several months of travel restrictions due to the COVID-19 pandemic, the governments of Alberta and Canada announced a new program to enable certain travellers to enter Canada more easily. Canadian citizens and essential workers entering Canada at Calgary, as well as at the Sweetgrass–Coutts Border Crossing, can be tested for the virus and, if they test negative, will be allowed to quarantine for only 48 hours instead of the usual 14 days.

Infrastructure

Passenger terminals

The Calgary International Airport houses two passenger terminals, one for domestic flights and the other for international flights.

The four-storey Domestic Terminal was originally opened in 1977 and has undergone a number of renovations in the decades following. The ground level of the terminal serves as the arrivals area with baggage claim and transportation facilities present. The second level of the terminal serves as the departures level and includes airport check-in, security and access to departure gates. The basement level of the airport contains utilities and tenant storage while the mezzanine level contains a food court, airline offices and the airport authority offices. The Domestic Terminal has three concourses: Concourses A, B, and C; with A and B serving WestJet and her subsidiaries, while Concourse C serves Air Canada. Concourse A includes departure gates A1-A24; Concourse B includes departure gates B31-B40; and Concourse C includes departure gates C50-C65.

The International Terminal was originally opened on 31 October 2016 and consists of five levels; utilities and baggage processing in the basement. Arrivals meet and greet areas, Canada Customs and relevant infrastructure on the ground level with departure check-in, security, US customs and the international departures concourse being located on the second floor. The third level contains the international departures concourse and finally the mezzanine level contains the US departure lounges. The International Terminal includes gates 70 through 97 shared across two concourses: Concourse D for all flights to and from foreign countries except the US as well as domestic flights; and Concourse E for flights to and from the United States. For the International Terminal, passengers travelling to the United States clear customs and immigration prior to departure at the preclearance facility.

The Domestic Terminal is connected to the International Terminal by a 620-metre walkway corridor and path for the YYC Link Passengers Shuttles; twenty, ten-seat electric vehicles used to transport connecting passengers.

WestJet, headquartered in Calgary and for which Calgary is the hub, has criticized the design of the international terminal, which opened in 2016. The airline's CEO stated that the distance between the terminals was too long for connecting travellers and that YYC Link was insufficient to solve this problem. As a result, WestJet had to alter its schedules in order to allow additional time for passengers transiting through Calgary. The Calgary Airport Authority responded that it did not see issues with the connections process, although it said passengers would need some time to adjust to the new facilities.

Runways

Calgary International Airport consists of two north–south parallel runways with two intersecting runways. The parallel runways are 17R/35L (west) which is generally used for aircraft arriving and departing to the west, and 17L/35R (east) which is generally used for aircraft arriving and departing to the east. During the winter months in Calgary, cold arctic air will move in from the north which means aircraft will primarily depart and arrive on north-facing runways (35R and 35L), while the summer months with warm winds from the south, aircraft will primarily take-off and land on south-facing runways (17R and 17L). The diagonal runway 11/29 is generally used when crosswinds are present, which commonly occurs in the summer when westerly Chinooks roll into Calgary, or when extreme wind conditions prohibit the use of the parallel runways. The fourth and smallest runway, 08/26, is almost exclusively used by light aircraft and the general aviation sector.

Calgary International Airport's four runways are as follows. with the following dimensions:

Runway 08/26 is 
Runway 11/29 is 
Runway 17R/35L is 
Runway 17L/35R is 

The longest runway in Canada at the time of its 2014 opening, Runway 17L/35R was built to reduce congestion and better accommodate larger, heavier aircraft: the weight of such aircraft, combined with the low air density resulting from the airport's high elevation and temperatures during the summer, means that a longer runway is necessary for take-off. Runway 17L/35R is also layered with concrete, a material more durable than the asphalt that composes the airport's other three runways.

Cargo area
Freight airlines such as Cargolux make regular trips to Europe, Asia, and other destinations. In 2017, the Calgary airport handled a total of 147,000 tonnes (144,678 tons) of cargo.

In 2011, Calgary International Airport received the Air Cargo World Award of Excellence for airports between 100,000 and 199,999 cargo tonnage, having the highest score for Canadian airports, and second highest for North-American airports.

Hotels
Calgary International Airport has two hotels located on site. The Calgary Airport Marriott In-Terminal Hotel is a 10-storey, 318 room hotel located in the international passenger terminal was opened On 1 September 2016. The Delta Hotels by Marriott Calgary Airport In-Terminal located across Airport Road from the domestic passenger terminal.

Other facilities
At , the airport's air traffic control tower was the tallest standalone control tower in Canada upon its opening in 2013; compared to the previous tower, it has space for more air traffic controllers and is situated closer to the centre of the airport, giving controllers better views of the airfield. Meanwhile, the headquarters of WestJet and its subsidiary WestJet Encore are located onsite.

Airlines and destinations

Passenger

Cargo

Statistics
In 2019, YYC Calgary International Airport was again the fourth-busiest airport in Canada in terms of the total number of passengers served, which was almost 18 million. This was another record year in passenger volume, surpassing the previous record set in 2018 by 3.54%.

Of the total for 2019, travellers bound for domestic destinations constituted 69.7% of all passenger traffic, while people travelling to the United States amounted to 19.6%, remaining 10.7% was traffic to international destinations, excluding United States.YYC's cargo operations grew significantly with 155,820 tonnes of cargo moving through the airport, an increase of 6.7% over the previous year.

Passenger and cargo traffic 

Calgary International Airport passenger and cargo volumes since 2010 are provided in the following table:

Top domestic routes

Ground transportation
Deerfoot Trail provides freeway access to the rest of the city. There is also a tunnel beneath Runway 17L/35R that links the east side of the airport site to the terminal buildings. Two parking garages and a rental-car facility are situated across from the terminals. Public transport options are also available at the airport: Buses operated by Calgary Transit link YYC Calgary International to downtown, a nearby station of the local CTrain light-rail network, and other parts of the city.

Notable accidents and incidents
On 10 May 1945, Royal Air Force No. 105 Squadron de Havilland DH.98 Mosquito B Mk IX (LR503) struck the control tower roof shortly after takeoff, shearing off the planes port wing, and crashed into the ground killing both crew members. The Mosquito, known as "F for Freddie" was a survivor of 213 operations over Europe, and crashed while performing a low level pass for spectators prior to flying to Red Deer and Lethbridge as part of cross country tour to support to garner support for 8th Victory Loan Drive.
On 24 August 1963, West Coast Airlines Flight 794, a Fairchild F-27 departing from Spokane International Airport to Calgary via Cranbrook made a crash-landing shortly before the runway. The probable cause of the accident was the pilot failed to maintain the approved minimum altitude on approach. There were no fatalities.
On 22 March 1984, Pacific Western Airlines Flight 501, a Boeing 737-200, aborted a take-off and exited the runway onto a taxiway after a component of the left engine broke off and hit the fuel stores in the wing, resulting in a fire that spread over the left and back portions of the plane. The flight attendants evacuated all passengers, while some suffered severe injuries, all the occupants survived.
On 17 July 1990, an Ecuadorian Air Force de Havilland Canada DHC-5 Buffalo (Registration HC-BFH) being ferried to Calgary from Quito, via Billings had the nosegear collapsed following touchdown on runway 28, igniting hydraulic fuel and resulting in the aircraft burning out. There were no fatalities.

See also
List of the busiest airports in North America

Notes

References

External links

 
 
 

Calgary
Certified airports in Alberta
Transport in Calgary
Canadian airports with United States border preclearance
National Airports System